The Cork-Kildare rivalry is a Gaelic football rivalry between Irish county teams Cork and Kildare, who first played each other in 1928. The fixture has been an infrequent one in the history of the championship, however, the rivalry intensified during a series of championship encounters between 2008 and 2015. Cork's home ground is Páirc Uí Chaoimh and Kildare's home ground is St. Conleth's Park, however, all of their championship meetings have been held at neutral venues, usually Croke Park.

While Cork have the second highest number of Munster titles and Kildare lie in third position behind Dublin and Meath on the roll of honour in Leinster, they have also enjoyed success in the All-Ireland Senior Football Championship, having won 11 championship titles between them to date.

All-time results

Legend

Senior

References

Kildare
Kildare county football team rivalries